Wies may refer to:

People
 Gerhard Wies, German athlete
 Nelly Wies-Weyrich (1933–2019), Luxembourgian archer
 Wies Moens (1898–1982), Belgian author
 Wies van Dongen (born 1931), Dutch racing cyclist

Places
 Wies, Austria
 Wies, Baden-Württemberg, Germany
 Wies, Waldbröl, Germany
 Wies pilgrimage church, Germany